Jalapuram is a village in the Guntur district of the Indian state of Andhra Pradesh. It is located in Pedakurapadu mandal of Guntur revenue division.

Government and politics 

Jalalpuram gram panchayat is the local self-government of the village. It is divided into wards and each ward is represented by a ward member. The ward members are headed by a Sarpanch. The village forms a part of Andhra Pradesh Capital Region and is under the jurisdiction of APCRDA.

Education 

As per the school information report for the academic year 2018–19, the village has a total of one Mandal Parishad school.

See also 
List of villages in Guntur district

References 

Villages in Guntur district